Paulo Frederico Benevenute (born 26 December 1973), known as Paulão, is a retired Brazilian footballer.

Biography
Born in Santo André, São Paulo state, Paulão played a season for São Paulo FC in 1999 Campeonato Brasileiro Série A, when he passed out in his presentation. He then played a season in Portugal for Vitória de Guimarães and moved back to Santa Cruz in August 2001. He played for Juventude in the next season, and left for Guarani in 2003. In October 2003 he left for Al Khor. In January 2005, he returned to Brazil and signed a contract until the end of 2005 Campeonato Paulista with Atlético Sorocaba. He then played for Série A side Vasco da Gama and Grêmio Barueri of Série B, and also played for Rio Branco Esporte Clube at 2007 Campeonato Paulista.

References

External links
 CBF 
 
 Futpedia 
 

Brazilian footballers
Primeira Liga players
São Paulo FC players
Vitória S.C. players
Santa Cruz Futebol Clube players
Esporte Clube Juventude players
Guarani FC players
Al-Khor SC players
Clube Atlético Sorocaba players
CR Vasco da Gama players
Rio Branco Esporte Clube players
Grêmio Barueri Futebol players
Madureira Esporte Clube players
Association football central defenders
Brazilian expatriate footballers
Expatriate footballers in Portugal
Expatriate footballers in Qatar
Brazilian expatriate sportspeople in Portugal
Brazilian expatriate sportspeople in Qatar
Footballers from São Paulo (state)
1973 births
Living people
Qatar Stars League players